Rashm (also Romanized as Reshm and Rishm; also known as Gulāki) is a village in Qohab-e Rastaq Rural District, Amirabad District, Damghan County, Semnan Province, Iran. At the 2006 census, its population was 327, in 78 families.

References 

Populated places in Damghan County